Starokulatkinsky District  is an administrative and municipal district (raion), one of the twenty-one in Ulyanovsk Oblast, Russia. It is located in the south of the oblast. Its administrative center is the urban locality (a work settlement) of Staraya Kulatka. Population: 14,731 (2010 Census);  The population of Staraya Kulatka accounts for 38.6% of the district's total population.

References

Notes

Sources

Districts of Ulyanovsk Oblast